Events from the year 1783 in France

Incumbents
 Monarch – Louis XVI

Events
 3 September Treaty of Paris
 21 November First manned hot air balloon flight

Births

 1 February – André Marie Jean Jacques Dupin, lawyer and politician (died 1865)
 5 July – Charles-Louis Havas, writer and founder of Agence France-Presse (died 1858).
 24 July – Frédéric de Lafresnaye, ornithologist (died 1861).
 19 December – Charles Julien Brianchon, mathematician and chemist (died 1864).

Deaths
 27 September – Étienne Bézout, mathematician (born 1730)
 5 December – Sophie d'Artois, princess (born 1776)
 - Marguerite Gourdan, brothel madam (born year unknown)

See also

References

1780s in France